Yoshikawa is a crater on Mercury, near the north pole.  It was named by the IAU in 2012 after the Japanese novelist Eiji Yoshikawa.

S band radar data from the Arecibo Observatory collected between 1999 and 2005 indicates a radar-bright area along the southern interior of Yoshikawa, which is probably indicative of a water ice deposit, and lies within the permanently shadowed part of the crater.

Yoshikawa is south of the slightly smaller Vonnegut crater.

References

Impact craters on Mercury